Mountains named Mount Hopkins or Hopkins Mountain: